Haplogroup L may refer to:
 Haplogroup L (Y-DNA), a human Y-chromosome (Y-DNA) haplogroup
 Macro-haplogroup L (mtDNA), a human mitochondrial DNA (mtDNA)  macrohaplogroup that is at the root of the human mitochondrial phylogenetic tree. Its subclades are:
 Haplogroup L0 (mtDNA), a human mitochondrial DNA (mtDNA) haplogroup
 Haplogroup L1 (mtDNA), a human mitochondrial DNA (mtDNA) haplogroup
 Haplogroup L2 (mtDNA), a human mitochondrial DNA (mtDNA) haplogroup
 Haplogroup L3 (mtDNA), a human mitochondrial DNA (mtDNA) haplogroup
 Haplogroup L4 (mtDNA), a human mitochondrial DNA (mtDNA) haplogroup
 Haplogroup L5 (mtDNA), a human mitochondrial DNA (mtDNA) haplogroup
 Haplogroup L6 (mtDNA), a human mitochondrial DNA (mtDNA) haplogroup
 Haplogroup L7, a human mitochondrial DNA (mtDNA) haplogroup; now Haplogroup L4a (mtDNA)